This is a list of airlines currently operating in Yemen.

Scheduled airlines

See also
 List of airlines
 List of defunct airlines of Yemen
 List of defunct airlines of Asia

References

Yemen
Airlines
Airlines
Yemen